The Holy Rosary Parish, also known as Santo Rosario Church, today fondly called by locals as "Pisambang Maragul" ("Big Church") stands in the epicenter of the old Culiat town, now Angeles City, Philippines. The church has recently been recognized by the National Commission for Culture and the Arts as a national historical site.

History

The foundations of the Holy Rosary Parish Church were first laid on October 18, 1877, by the founding families of Angeles City led by Don Mariano V. Henson. It was laid out by city planners in the Spanish colonial era and is now one of the most distinctive landmarks of the city today because of its historical significance relating to how it was built. The church was constructed from 1877 to 1896 by the "Polo y Servicio" labor system, defined as the forced and unpaid labor of the Filipino native people for 40 days per year to all males from 16–65 years old by the Spanish colonial government. The first mass was held when only half of the church was built on April 14, 1886. The second half of the church, which  includes the building's distinctive dome, was finished on September 17, 1891. The twin bells were rung for the first time on February 12, 1896. The church was finally finished as it still stands today in October 1909. Its engineering and architectural skills were provided by Don Antonio de la Camara from Manila.
<3
The backyard of the church became the execution grounds from 1896-1898 in shooting down Filipino rebels and suspects by the Spanish forces. And it was also used by the U.S. Army as a military hospital from 1899 to 1900. The church's belfry was destroyed in the 1940s as a result of World War II. It was immediately restored by the government with the help of American troops and was finished by early 1944. Today, the Holy Rosary Parish Church serves as the city's main religious center, being located at the front of the former city hall, now known as the Museo ning Angeles. Local devotees flock the church and faithfully attend activities especially during Holy Week. Two of the awaited activities are the Good Friday Procession, where bare-footed followers of the Apung Mamacalulu, or the Holy Sepulchre join the procession in the city complex; and the Salubong, held at the Nepo Parking Lot, that ends with the traditional meeting of the Risen Christ and Virgin Mary amidst the fireworks.

2019 Luzon earthquake 

On April 22, 2019, a 6.1 magnitude earthquake struck the island of Luzon in the Philippines, leaving at least 18 dead, three missing and injuring at least 256 others. Despite of the epicenter was in Zambales, most of the damage to infrastructure occurred in the neighboring province of Pampanga, which suffered damage to 29 buildings and structures, including churches.

During the 2019 Luzon earthquake, the church sustained critical damage in two pillars and several windows’ concrete frames, as well as cracks in several walls on the ceiling.

Restoration 
The 2019 Luzon earthquake exposed the church’s deteriorating conditions that demanded repair, restoration and conservation work. Installation of shoring, and removal of debris and components were done to ensure the church's safety. Moreover, engineering works were performed to remove additions made to the structure over time and repair masonry defects on the west bell tower.

The church's restoration work takes 5 years and requires 100 million pesos funding.

References

External links

Churches of Pampanga http://www.andropampanga.com/churches/angelescity_church.htm.

Buildings and structures in Angeles City
Roman Catholic churches in Pampanga
Churches in the Roman Catholic Archdiocese of San Fernando